Hong Suk-Man(Korean:홍석만) is a Paralympian athlete from South Korea competing mainly in category T53 sprint events.

He competed in the 2004 Summer Paralympics in Athens, Greece.  There he won a gold medal in the men's 100 metres - T53 event, a gold medal in the men's 200 metres - T53 event, a silver medal in the men's 400 metres - T53 event and was disqualified in   the men's 4 x 400 metre relay - T53-54 event.  He also competed at the 2008 Summer Paralympics in Beijing, China.    There he won a gold medal in the men's 400 metres - T53 event, a bronze medal in the men's 200 metres - T53 event, a bronze medal in the men's 4 x 100 metre relay - T53-54 event and a bronze medal in the men's 800 metres - T53 event

References

External links
 

Paralympic athletes of South Korea
South Korean wheelchair racers
Athletes (track and field) at the 2004 Summer Paralympics
Athletes (track and field) at the 2008 Summer Paralympics
Athletes (track and field) at the 2012 Summer Paralympics
Paralympic gold medalists for South Korea
Paralympic silver medalists for South Korea
Paralympic bronze medalists for South Korea
Living people
Medalists at the 2004 Summer Paralympics
Medalists at the 2008 Summer Paralympics
Year of birth missing (living people)
Paralympic medalists in athletics (track and field)
Medalists at the 2010 Asian Para Games
Medalists at the 2014 Asian Para Games
Medalists at the World Para Athletics Championships